Richard Miller (December 6, 1942 – December 8, 2022) was an American sculptor and visual effects artist. He worked on such films as Star Trek: First Contact, Who Framed Roger Rabbit, and The Rocketeer.  He created Princess Leia's bikini.

Miller died in Northern California on December 8, 2022, at the age of 80.

References

External links

1942 births
2022 deaths
20th-century American sculptors
21st-century American sculptors
Visual effects artists